Lee Joseph Fogolin (born February 7, 1955) is a Canadian former professional ice hockey player who played in the National Hockey League.  He played for the Buffalo Sabres and the Edmonton Oilers, appearing in 924 NHL regular season games between 1974 and 1987, winning the Stanley Cup in 1984 and 1985.

Early career

Fogolin played from 1972–1974 with the Oshawa Generals of the OHA, scoring 52 points in 102 games with 240 PIM. He was drafted in the first round, 11th overall, of the 1974 NHL Entry Draft by the Buffalo Sabres.

Fogolin chose to play for the Team USA in the 1976 Canada Cup, and was invited again in 1984, but declined to play.

NHL playing career
Fogolin played his first professional season (1974–75) in Buffalo, but split the next season between the Sabres and the AHL Hershey Bears. He was acquired by the Edmonton Oilers for the 1979–1980 season through the NHL Expansion Draft.

Fogolin played seven full seasons with Edmonton, and was named as captain for the 1981–82 season. He was the first of four captains to lead the Oilers to the Stanley Cup finals, in 1983, where they lost to the New York Islanders. While a solid defenseman in his own right, he was overshadowed by many of the young stars on the Oilers' roster, most notably the scoring superstar Wayne Gretzky. Fogolin stepped aside as captain and gave the captaincy to Gretzky for the 1983–84 season onwards. Fogolin was a member of the Oilers' Stanley Cup wins in 1984 and 1985. Fogolin also played in the 1986 National Hockey League All-Star Game.

Fogolin was re-acquired by the Sabres with Mark Napier for Wayne Van Dorp, Normand Lacombe and future considerations near the end of the 1986–87 season, and retired after completing the season with them.

Personal
Fogolin was born in Chicago while his father, Lee Fogolin Sr., was a member of the Chicago Blackhawks. His father also played for the Detroit Red Wings and won the Stanley Cup in 1950. Fogolin was raised in Thunder Bay, Ontario when his father's career ended.

His son, Michael Fogolin, played for the Prince George Cougars in the WHL and died in his sleep on May 26, 2004, of a possible heart condition.

Fogolin currently resides in Edmonton, Alberta.

Awards and achievements
1983–84 - NHL - Stanley Cup (Edmonton)
1984–85 - NHL - Stanley Cup (Edmonton)
1985–86 - National Hockey League All-Star Game

Career statistics

International

See also
Notable families in the NHL

References

External links

Oilers Heritage biography.
Fogolin's profile at hockeydraftcentral.com

1955 births
Living people
American emigrants to Canada
American men's ice hockey defensemen
Buffalo Sabres draft picks
Buffalo Sabres players
Canadian ice hockey defencemen
Edmonton Oilers players
Ice hockey people from Chicago
Ice hockey people from Ontario
Sportspeople from Thunder Bay
National Hockey League first-round draft picks
Oshawa Generals players
Stanley Cup champions